Ocean's Kingdom is the fifth classical album by Paul McCartney. It is the score of the ballet of the same name, commissioned by the New York City Ballet. It was performed by the London Classical Orchestra and conducted by John Wilson. The album was released on CD and vinyl, on 3 October 2011 by Decca (UK) and October 4 (US) by Hear Music/Telarc (US). In the United States, it peaked at number 144 on the Billboard 200 chart. The album has a score of 60 out of 100 at Metacritic, based on eight reviews, signifying a "mixed or average" critical response.

The ballet tells of a love story based in two fantastic worlds – the "pure" ocean kingdom, and the Earth kingdom with its "sort of baddies" who threaten the underwater way of life. According to McCartney, love happens when earth meets water, and "you'll have to see whether the couple make it". His score for the ballet consists of four orchestral movements.

Track listing
All pieces by Paul McCartney.

Movement 1
 "Ocean's Kingdom" – 14:07

Movement 2
"Hall of Dance" – 16:19

Movement 3
"Imprisonment" – 13:36

Movement 4
"Moonrise" – 12:31

Bonus Track edition
Available through iTunes and as a digital download with the code card included in the CD and LP, it contains the studio & live versions of the four movements. The live tracks are from the world première on 21 September 2011, as performed by the New York City Ballet Orchestra & conducted by Fayçal Karoui.

Movement 1
 "Ocean's Kingdom" (Live) – 12:15

Movement 2
"Hall of Dance" (Live) – 14:27

Movement 3
"Imprisonment" (Live) – 10:14

Movement 4
"Moonrise" (Live) – 10:31

References

2011 albums
Music for orchestra and organ
2011 classical albums
Paul McCartney albums